SS Sea Falcon may refer to:

 , a Type C3-S-A2 ship built by Ingalls Shipbuilding for the United States Maritime Commission (MC hull no. 880); sold in 1947; scrapped in 1978
 , a later name for the German-built SS Indus; known as Sea Falcon from 1968–1971; scrapped in 1971

Ship names